William Foley was an American college football player and coach. He served ad the head football coach at the University of Cincinnati for one season, in 1906, compiling a record of 0–7–2. Foley was also captain of the 1905 Cincinnati football team.

Head coaching record

References

Year of birth missing
Year of death missing
Cincinnati Bearcats football coaches
Cincinnati Bearcats football players